Ronald Edward Galella (January 10, 1931 – April 30, 2022) was an American photographer, known as a pioneer paparazzo. Dubbed "Paparazzo Extraordinaire" by Newsweek and "the Godfather of the U.S. paparazzi culture" by Time magazine and Vanity Fair, he is regarded by Harper's Bazaar as "arguably the most controversial paparazzo of all time".  He photographed many celebrities out of the public eye and gained notice for his feuds with some of them, including Jacqueline Onassis and Marlon Brando. Despite the numerous controversies and claims of stalking, Galella's work was praised and exhibited in art galleries worldwide.

During his career, Galella took more than three million photographs of public figures.

Early life
Galella was born in New York City on January 10, 1931, in a family of Italian heritage. His father, Vincenzo, was an immigrant from Muro Lucano, Basilicata, who manufactured pianos and coffins; his mother, Michelina (Marinaccio), was born in New Jersey to immigrants from Benevento, Campania, and worked as a crochet beader. After graduating high school, he won a two-year scholarship at the Pratt Institute in Brooklyn but turned it down due to his deficiencies in mathematics.

Galella served as a United States Air Force photographer from 1951 to 1955, including during the Korean War. He later attended the Art Center College of Design in Los Angeles, California, graduating with a degree in photojournalism in 1958.  In his free time, Galella took pictures of the stars arriving at film premieres, selling them to magazines like National Enquirer and Photoplay. He soon became known for his photographic approach, portraying famous people out of the spotlight.

Career
Galella's photographs have been featured in hundreds of publications including Time, Harper's Bazaar, Vogue, Vanity Fair, People, Rolling Stone, The New Yorker, The New York Times, and Life. In his in-home darkroom, Galella made his own prints which have been exhibited at museums and galleries throughout the world, including the MoMA in New York City,  San Francisco Museum of Modern Art, the Tate Modern in London, and the Helmut Newton Foundation Museum of Photography in Berlin.

In 2009, his father's hometown of Muro Lucano made Galella an honorary citizen. He was the subject of a 2010 documentary film by Leon Gast entitled Smash His Camera. The film's title is a quote from Jacqueline Kennedy Onassis directed to her security agent after Galella pursued her and her children through Central Park, New York. The documentary premiered at the 2010 Sundance Film Festival, winning the Grand Jury Award for Directing in the U.S. Documentary category.  It also received positive reviews at the 54th BFI London Film Festival before it aired on the BBC.

Controversies 

Galella was known for his obsessive picture taking of Jacqueline Onassis and the subsequent legal battles associated with it. The New York Post called it "the most co-dependent celeb-pap[arazzo] relationship ever". The 1972 free-speech trial Galella v. Onassis resulted in a restraining order to keep Galella 50 yards (later changed to 25 feet) away from Onassis. He was found guilty of breaking this order four times and faced seven years in jail and a $120,000 fine; later settling for a $10,000 fine and surrendering his rights to photograph Jackie and her children.

On June 12, 1973, actor Marlon Brando punched Galella in the face outside a restaurant in Chinatown in New York City, breaking the photographer's jaw and knocking out five of his teeth on the left side of his mouth. Galella had been following Brando, who was accompanied by Dick Cavett, to the restaurant after a taping of The Dick Cavett Show earlier that day. Galella hired lawyers Stuart Schlesinger and Alfred Julien to sue Brando and ultimately settled for US$40,000. Schlesinger reported in the 2010 documentary Smash His Camera that Galella received two-thirds, but only cared about getting the message out, "I don't want anyone to think they can go around punching me if I am taking their picture. Get that story out, not the money." The next time Galella chased Brando, he wore a football helmet.

Galella once lost a tooth when he was beaten by Richard Burton's security guards. He unsuccessfully sued the actor. Elizabeth Taylor, who tended to be tolerant towards photographers, was often heard to mutter, "I'm going to kill Ron Galella!", although the actress would later use his photographs in her biography. Galella's other targets included Elvis Presley, whose bodyguards slashed his tires, Brigitte Bardot, whose security staff hosed him down, the restaurateur Elaine Kaufman of Elaine's once threw a trashcan lid at his head, and Sean Penn, who spat at him and reportedly punched him while being photographed with his then-wife Madonna.

In spite of these controversies, art galleries across the world have valued his work for its artistic and socio-historical value. He was praised by Andy Warhol, who said: "My idea of a good picture is one that's in focus and of a famous person doing something unfamous. It's being in the right place at the wrong time. That's why my favorite photographer is Ron Galella". Art writer Glenn O'Brien defined him as a "brilliant realist able to represent the world faithfully".  One of Galella's pictures depicting Jacqueline Onassis, dubbed "Windblown Jackie", was included among  "The most influential images of all time" by Time magazine in 2016.

Personal life
Galella married Betty Lou Burke in 1979.  She worked as a photo editor for Today Is Sunday, and was subsequently his business partner.  They remained married until her death on January 9, 2017, at the age of 68.  Speaking of his wife, Galella said, "When Betty first purchased my photos for publication and granted me assignment credentials over the phone, I fell in love with her warm soft, loving voice. I met her in person for the first time, two years later, on Dec. 10, 1978, at the Kennedy Center for the premiere of Superman. With one look at that beautiful girl, I said, 'I'm gonna marry you.' And five months later, we were. Once married, we became a team."

After retiring as a paparazzo, Galella was active as a photographer at prominent culture events. He resided in Montville, New Jersey, during his later years.

Galella died on April 30, 2022, at his home in Montville, New Jersey.  He was 91, and suffered from congestive heart failure prior to his death.

Publications
 Jacqueline. 1974, Sheed and Ward. .
 Offguard: A Paparazzi Look at the Beautiful People. 1976, McGraw-Hill. .
 The Photographs of Ron Galella: 1965–1989. 2001, Greybull. .
 Ron Galella Exclusive Diary. 2004, Photology. .
 Disco Years. 2006, PowerHouse Books. .
 Warhol by Galella: That's Great!. 2008, Verlhac; Montacelli; Seeman Henschel. .
 No Pictures. 2008, PowerHouse. .
 Viva l'Italia!. 2009, Galella; Distributed by PowerHouse. .
 Man in the Mirror: Michael Jackson. 2009, PowerHouse. .
 Boxing With the Stars. 2011, Verlhac. .
 Ron Galella: Paparazzo Extraordinaire with Mathias Prinz (2012, Hatje Cantz. .
 Jackie: My ObsessionJ. 2013, Galella. .
 Pop, Rock & Dance. 2013, Galella. .
 The Stories Behind the Pictures. 2014, Galella. .
 Sex in Fashion. 2015, Galella. .
 Rock and Roll. 2016, Galella. .
 Donald Trump the Master Builder. 2017, Galella. .
 Shooting Stars. January 2019, Galella. .
 100 Iconic Photographs – A retrospective by Ron Galella. November 2021, Galella. .

Exhibitions

 Soho Gallery, 1972, New York City
 G. Ray Hawkins Gallery, 1976, New York City
 Rizzoli Gallery, 1976, New York City
 Union Carbide, 1977, New York City
 William Lyons Gallery, 1980 Coconut Grove, Florida
 Octagon Club, 1987, New York City
 Nikon Gallery, 1993, New York City
 Serge Sorokko Gallery, 1997, New York City
Andy Warhol Museum, Ron Galella Retrospective, June 2002 – September 2002 Pittsburgh, PA
 Paul Kasmin Gallery, The Photographs of Ron Galella, 2002, New York City
 Holt-Renfrew, Flick, 2003 Toronto, Canada
 Photology, Ron Galella Exclusive Diary, 2004 Milan, Italy
 Galerie Wouter van Leeuwen, The Photographs of Ron Galella, 2004/5, Amsterdamn, Netherlands
 Artelibro Festival of Art and Books, Ron Galella Exclusive Diary: Caught Off-Guard, 2005, Bologna, Italy
 Ferragamo Gallery, Ron Galella Exclusive Diary: Caught Off-Guard, 2005, New York City
 Kunstforum, Superstars: From Warhol to Madonna, 2005/6
 PowerHouse Arena, Ron Galella: The Kennedy,, New York City
 Paul Kasmin Gallery, Disco Years, 2005/6, New York City
 Buro Beelende Kunst Vlissinger Ron Galella: The One and Only Paparazzo, Brooklyn, New York
 Galerie Wouter van Leeuwen, Disco Years, 2006/7, Amsterdamn, Netherlands
 PowerHouse Arena, Warhol is Dead!, 2007
 The Gershwin Hotel – 2007, New York City
 PowerHouse Arena, That 70's Show, 2007 Brooklyn, New York
 The Museum of Modern Art, Iconic Photos of Ron Galella acquired into collection, 2007, New York City
 The Museum of Modern Art, Iconic Photos of Ron Galella acquired into collection, 2008, New York City
 The Tate Modern Museum, Street + Stuido: An Urband History of Photography, 2008 London, England
 The Hollywood Roosevelt Hotel Warhol by Galella: That's Great!, 2008–Present Hollywood, CA
 Galerie Wouter van Leeuwen, Warhol by Galella: That's Great!, 2008–Present Amsterdam, Netherlands
 Staly-Wise Gallery, Warhol by Galella: That's Great!, 2008–Present, New York City
 GMW Law Offices, Offguard: Ron Galella Photography, 2008–Present Den Haag, Netherlands
 Helmut Newton Foundation Museum of Photography, Pigozzi and the Paparazzi, 2008 Berlin, Germany
 Hamburger Bahnfof Museum Fur Gegenwart, Celebrities: Andy Warhol and the Stars 2008/9
 Palazzo Lanfranchi, Carlo Levi Hall, Ron Galella: Italian Icons, 2009, Matera, Italy
 Archeology Museum of Muro Lucano, Viva l'Italia, 2009–Present
 La Casa Encendida, 2009, Madrid, Spain
 MART Museo di arte moderna e contemporanea di Trento e Rovereto, Picturing New York: Photographs from the Museum of Modern Art, 2009, Rovereto, Italy
 Centaur Theatre Company, Viva l'Italia, 2009, Montreal, Canada
 Irish Museum of Modern Art, Picturing New York: Photographs from the Museum of Modern Art, 2009/10, Dublin
 Lena Di Gangi Gallery, The Photographs of Ron Galella, 2009/10, Totawa, NJ
 PowerHouse Arena, Man in the Mirror: Michael Jackson by Ron Galella, 2009, Brooklyn, NY
 Foam Fotografiemuseum Amsterdam, Netherlands- Ron Galella: Paparazzo Extraordinaire!, 2012
 Galerie La Flo, St. Tropex France, Boxing with the Stars, 2012
 Fundación Novacaixagalicia, Ron Galella: Paparazzo Extraordinaire!, La Coruña, Spain, 2013/14, Pontevedra, Spain, 2014
 Centre Pompidou Paparazzi!, Metz, France, Photographers, Stars, and Artists, 2014
 Staley-Wise Gallery, Pop, Rock & Dance, 2013/14, New York City
 Fotomuseum Winterthur, Switzerland, 2014
 Albertina, Blow-Up -Vienna, Austria,  2014
 Schirn Kunsthalle, Frankfurt, Germany, Paparazzi! Photographers, Stars, and Artists, 2014
 Musée de l'Elysée, Lausanne, Switzerland, Paparazzi! Photographers, Stars, and Artists, 2014/15
 C/O Berlin, Berlin, Germany, Blow-Up, 2015
 Photology Noto, Noto, Sicily, Vintage Galella, 2015
 Photology Garzón, Garzón, Uruguay, Vintage Galella, 2016
 Staley Wise Gallery, New York City, 55 Years a Paparazzi, 2015
 Int'l Center for Photography, New York City, Public, Private Secret, 2017
 Photology Online Gallery, Exclusive Diary, 2021
 Palazzo Sarcinelli, Conegliano, Italy, Ron Galella, Paparazzo Superstar, 2022

References

External links

 
 
 

1931 births
2022 deaths
United States Air Force personnel of the Korean War
American photographers
People from Montville, New Jersey
United States Air Force airmen
Military personnel from New York City
American people of Italian descent
Photographers from the Bronx
Art Center College of Design alumni
Deaths from congestive heart failure